Clone Your Lover is the first studio album of the Norwegian industrial rock band Zeromancer.

Track listing 
All tracks composed by Kim Ljung.
 "Clone Your Lover" – 3:50
 "Flirt (With Me)" – 3:59
 "Something for the Pain" – 3:32
 "Split Seconds" – 3:16
 "Fade to Black" – 3:55
 "God Bless the Models" – 4:10
 "Opelwerk" – 3:27
 "Flagellation" – 3:53
 "Die of a Broken Heart" – 3:25
 "Houses of Cards" – 3:58
 "Something for the Pain (Apoptygma Berzerk Remix)" (on US version)

Personnel 
Alex Møklebust – vocals
Kim Ljung – bass, backing vocals
Noralf Ronthi – drums
Chris Schleyer – guitar
Erik Ljunggren – keyboards, programming

Production personnel 
James Saez - producer
Ronald Prent - mixing
Björn Engelmann - mastering

References 

Allmusic review

2000 debut albums
Zeromancer albums